Guizhi Fuling Wan is a brown pill used in Traditional Chinese medicine to "activate blood circulation, to remove blood stasis and mass in the abdomen". It is sweet in taste. It is used where there are symptoms such as "masses in the abdomen of women, amenorrhea due to blood stasis, menses with bellyache, or persistent lochia after delivery". In clinical practice, medical scientists have discovered that Gui Zhi Fu Ling Wan can also treat some internal medical diseases and male diseases. Honey is used as the binding agent, and each pill weighs about 6 grams.

History 
Guizhi Fuling Wan has a history of more than 1,800 years, and its inventor is Zhang Zhongjing.

Chinese classic herbal formula

See also
 Chinese classic herbal formula
 Bu Zhong Yi Qi Wan
Zhang Zhongjing

References

Traditional Chinese medicine pills